Ashe County is a county located in the United States state of North Carolina. As of the 2020 census, the population was 26,577. Its county seat is Jefferson.

History

Historical evidence shows that Ashe County was inhabited by Native Americans, which included the Cherokee, Creek, and Shawnee tribes. Pieces of broken pottery, arrowheads, and other Native American artifacts have been found, indicating their presence. Most of these artifacts have been found in the Old Fields area  of Ashe County.

The  earliest Europeans to explore Ashe   County were Bishop August Gottlieb Spangenberg – head of the Moravian Church in America – and his associates, Timothy Horsefield, Joseph Mueller, Henry Antes, Johan Merck, and Herman Loesch. Bishop Spangenberg wrote about his  journey in Ashe in a diary that has  been preserved by the Moravian church. He was given  in Virginia as a place for his fellow Moravians to settle. The only one of Spangenberg's group to return  and permanently settle in Ashe County was Herman Loesch. Other early settlers were David Helton,  William Walling, William McLain and Daniel Boone, the famous pioneer. With the exception of Boone, these men and their families all settled in Ashe in 1771.

During the Revolutionary War one skirmish was fought in Ashe County, the Battle of Big Glades. The battle was fought in July 1780 between a force of Americans, led by Captain Robert Love, and a force of 150 British Loyalists on their way to Charlotte to join Lord Cornwallis, the British commander in the Southern colonies.  The Americans won the skirmish.

In the 1780s, Ashe County was a part of the self-declared "State of Franklin", within the boundaries of its Washington County. The "State of Franklin" marked the beginnings of the State of Tennessee. Many family surnames noted in the 1800 Ashe County Census, Blevins, Hart, Bare, Barker, Stamper, Miller, Burkett, Gambill, Baldwin, and Ballou as a sample, are still present today. Ashe County was named in honor of Samuel Ashe, a Revolutionary patriot, a superior court judge, and the Governor of North Carolina from 1795 to 1798.

From 1807 to 1913, the county went through numerous boundary changes. In 1849, to form Watauga County, the southwestern part of Ashe County was combined with parts of Caldwell County, Wilkes County, and Yancey County. Ten years later in 1859, the eastern part of the remainder of Ashe County became Alleghany County.

Geography

Ashe County is located in extreme northwestern North Carolina. The county is bordered by two states: Virginia on the north; and Tennessee to the west. The county is located entirely within the Appalachian Mountains region of North Carolina. Numerous mountains and hills dot the plateau. In total, five mountains in the county rise to over 5,000 feet.

The county's main river is the New River, one of the oldest rivers in the world, and one of the few major rivers in the southeastern United States to flow primarily north instead of south, east, or west. 34 creeks and streams flow into the New River in Ashe County. In 1998 the river was designated an "American Heritage River" by President Bill Clinton, and it is famed for its beautiful rural scenery, clear water, fly fishing, and kayaking and canoeing.

Isolated by mountainous terrain from the remainder of North Carolina to the east, Ashe County was described in the 19th and early 20th centuries as one of the Lost Provinces of North Carolina.

Ashe County generally is known for its mountain scenery, and the tourism industry is an important mainstay of the county's economy. The Blue Ridge Parkway runs along the county's southeastern border. Ashe County has historically consisted of rural farmland, with numerous cattle and poultry farms. However, cattle farming in recent decades has given way to the industry of raising Christmas trees. Many cattle farmers have switched to growing Christmas trees, and in 1997, 2007, 2008, and 2012, an Ashe County Christmas tree was selected as the official White House Christmas Tree by the National Christmas Tree Association. The tree was put on display in the Blue Room (White House). As of 2014 Ashe County grows more Christmas trees than any other county in the Eastern United States.

Climate
Ashe County, North Carolina has a considerably different climate than most of the Southeastern United States. Temperatures rarely exceed , but on rare occasions can reach the mid-90s as they did in 2012 – the most recent that 90+ was observed. + has never been observed. Summer nights are cool, and temperatures often dip to near  even in July. Considerably more snow falls on the peaks and the western slopes of the Appalachian Mountains. Snow has been observed as early as around October 1 and as late as around May 1. Ashe County is also a very windy location especially in winter when several times per year the Jefferson Airport sees the wind gusting . In addition it does get very cold in Ashe County. In January 2014 the low temperature dipped below  several times, the coldest being  on January 30–31. Single digit temperatures, often just above zero Fahrenheit, are observed most winter seasons on occasion. The average winter high is in the 40s with an average low near . Ashe County often feels more like the northeastern United States when wind chill factors are also observed.

National protected areas
 Blue Ridge Parkway (part)
 Cherokee National Forest (part)

State and local protected areas 
 Mount Jefferson State Natural Area
 New River State Park (part)
 Phoenix Lake, Ashe County Park
 Pond Mountain Game Lands
 Thurmond Chatham Wildlife Management Area (part)
 West Jefferson Municipal Park

Major water bodies 
 Big Horse Creek
 Brush Creek
 Cranberry Creek
 Helton Creek
 Hoskin Fork
 Grassy Creek (Elkin Creek tributary)
 Little Horse Creek
 Little Phoenix Creek
 Long Hope Creek
 Mill Creek
 New River (Kanawha River tributary)
 North Fork New River
 Obids Creek
 Roundabout Creek
 South Fork New River

Adjacent counties 
Grayson County, Virginia – north
Alleghany County – east
Wilkes County – southeast
Watauga County – southwest
Johnson County, Tennessee – west

Major highways

Major infrastructure 
 Ashe County Airport

Demographics

2020 census

As of the 2020 United States census, there were 26,577 people, 11,938 households, and 7,894 families residing in the county.

2010 census
As of the census of 2010, there were 27,281 people, 11,755 households, and 8,030 families residing in the county.  The population density was 60 people per square mile (23/km2).  There were 17,342 total housing units at an average density of 37 per square mile (12/km2). Of the total 11,755 housing units were occupied.

The racial makeup of the county was:
 95.5% White
 0.6% Black or African American
 0.2% Native American
 0.4% Asian
 0.01% Pacific Islander
 2.2% from other races
 1.0% from two or more races.

4.8% of the population was Hispanic or Latino of any race.

There were 11,755 households, out of which 23.1% had children under the age of 18 living with them, 54.5% were married couples living together, 9.3% had a female householder with no husband present, and 31.7% were non-families. 27.5% of all households were made up of individuals, and 13.0% had someone living alone who was 65 years of age or older.  The average household size was 2.29 and the average family size was 2.75.

In the county, the age distribution of the population shows 10.5% under 10, 10.9% from 10 to 19, 9.9% from 20 to 29, 11.6% from 30 to 39, 13.8% from 40 to 49, 15.2% from 50 to 59, 14% from 60 to 69, 8.7% from 70 to 79, and 5.1% who were 80 years of age or older.  The median age was 45.5 years. For every 100 females, there were 97.80 males.  For every 100 females age 18 and over, there were 96.39 males.

The per capita income was $20,706 and the median household income was $34,056.  18.1% of the population was below the poverty level.

2000 census
As of the census of 2000, there were 24,384 people, 10,411 households, and 7,423 families residing in the county.  The population density was 57 people per square mile (22/km2).  There were 13,268 housing units at an average density of 31 per square mile (12/km2).

The racial makeup of the county was:
 97.16% White
 0.66% Black or African American
 0.32% Native American
 0.23% Asian
 0.01% Pacific Islander
 1.05% from other races
 0.56% from two or more races.

2.42% of the population was Hispanic or Latino of any race.

There were 10,411 households, out of which 26.20% had children under the age of 18 living with them, 59.40% were married couples living together, 8.40% had a female householder with no husband present, and 28.70% were non-families. 25.80% of all households were made up of individuals, and 12.10% had someone living alone who was 65 years of age or older.  The average household size was 2.31 and the average family size was 2.75.

In the county, the age distribution of the population shows 19.80% under the age of 18, 7.50% from 18 to 24, 27.00% from 25 to 44, 27.70% from 45 to 64, and 18.00% who were 65 years of age or older.  The median age was 42 years. For every 100 females, there were 97.40 males.  For every 100 females age 18 and over, there were 94.90 males.

The median income for a household in the county was $28,824, and the median income for a family was $36,052. Males had a median income of $25,666 versus $19,983 for females. The per capita income for the county was $16,429.  About 10.10% of families and 13.50% of the population were below the poverty line, including 16.30% of those under age 18 and 17.30% of those ages 65 and over.

Government and politics
Owing to its rural character Ashe County is a strongly Republican county, if not historically comparable to geographically similar Avery or Mitchell. The last Democratic presidential nominee to carry Ashe County was Jimmy Carter in 1976, and the last to reach forty percent of the county's vote was Bill Clinton in 1992. Recent elections have seen Ashe, like almost all Appalachia counties, trend rapidly towards the Republican Party. Hillary Clinton won just 26 percent of the county's ballots in 2016.

Like most counties in North Carolina, Ashe County is governed by a five-member Board of County Commissioners. In the North Carolina Senate, Ashe County lies in the 47th Senate district and is represented by Republican Deanna Ballard. In the North Carolina House of Representatives, Ashe County lies in the 93rd district and is represented by Republican Ray Pickett.

Media
The Ashe Post and Times is the newspaper of record for Ashe County, serving readers with the latest news and events throughout the county. It is a weekly, paid circulation newspaper that is published every Wednesday with breaking news posted immediately on ashepostandtimes.com. The newspaper is owned by Adams Publishing Group, which also owns the Watauga Democrat.

Communities

Towns
 Jefferson (county seat and largest town)
 Lansing
 West Jefferson

Townships

 Chestnut Hill
 Clifton
 Creston
 Elk
 Grassy Creek
 Helton
 Horse Creek
 Hurricane
 Jefferson
 Laurel
 North Fork
 Obids
 Old Fields
 Peak Creek
 Pine Swamp
 Piney Creek
 Pond Mountain
 Walnut Hill
 West Jefferson

Unincorporated communities

 Beaver Creek
 Bina
 Chestnut Hill
 Clifton
 Comet
 Creston
 Crumpler
 Fig
 Fleetwood
 Glendale Springs
 Grassy Creek
 Grayson
 Helton
 Parker
 Scottville
 Sturgills
 Todd
 Warrensville

Population ranking
The population ranking of the following table is based on the 2022 estimate of Ashe County.

† county seat

Notable people
Ashe County has been home to, produced, or been visited by, several prominent people. It is the hometown of Monte Weaver from Helton who pitched for the Washington Senators and pitched a World Series game in 1933. After being traded from the Senators, he pitched for the Boston Red Sox, before being called into service in World War II. Weaver died in 1994. Albert Hash a well-known and beloved fiddler and instrument maker at one time resided in Lansing. Helen Keller visited an Ashe County native, Marvin Osborne, in 1944 when he was wounded in France in World War II. Loretta Lynn sang at the Central Food Market in West Jefferson in the late 1960s (the Central Food building formally housed a locally owned auto parts store and is now the location of a local restaurant). Roni Stoneman was a visitor to Ashe Park in the 1980s. In 1998, then-President Bill Clinton and his vice-president, Al Gore, held a ceremony on the banks of the scenic New River to designate it as an American Heritage River. After the ceremony, both men had lunch at the historic Glendale Springs Inn, also located in Ashe County.  Fiddle player G. B. Grayson was born in Ashe County in 1887. Daniel Boone spent some time in the eastern part of Ashe County  which is now Obids.

See also
 List of counties in North Carolina
 National Register of Historic Places listings in Ashe County, North Carolina
 North Carolina–Tennessee–Virginia Corners
 Holy Communion Episcopal Parish
 North Carolina State Parks
 National Park Service
 List of national forests of the United States

References

External links

 
 
 New River Notes

 
1799 establishments in North Carolina
Populated places established in 1799
History of the America (South) Province of the Moravian Church
Counties of Appalachia
Western North Carolina
State of Franklin